Michy is a given name and surname. People with this name include:
 Claude Michy (born 1949), French football investor
 Michy Batshuayi (born 1993), Belgian football striker
 Michelle "Michy" Lemmens, singer for Dutch Eurodance musical project Starstylers

See also
Michelle (name), of which Michy is sometimes a hypocorism
Michi (disambiguation)